Marzio Ginetti (6 April 1585 – 1 March 1671) was an Italian Catholic Cardinal and Cardinal Vicar of Rome.

Early life

Ginetti was born in Velletri, the son of a labourer. He was sent to Rome at a very young age to be educated and tried to make himself known to a number of cardinals. Eventually he was appointed chamberlain to Pope Paul V. Upon that Pope's death, Maffeo Barberini was elected as Pope Urban VIII and Ginetti became acquainted with Cardinal Francesco Barberini, the new Pope's nephew. Barberini urged his uncle to promote Ginetti and he was made a Referendary of the Tribunals of the Apostolic Signatura. Thereafter he remained a loyal supporter of the Barberini.

Cardinalate

On 19 January 1626 he was elevated to cardinal by Pope Urban VIII and installed as Cardinal-Priest at Santa Francesca Romana in 1627. In 1629 he was made Cardinal Vicar (a title he held until his death) and was made Cardinal-Priest at Sant'Angelo in Pescheria in 1634.

In 1635 Ginetti was appointed Papal Legate to Austria in an attempt, by the Barberini, to put him forward as an elder statesman. But he did not conduct himself particularly well and the effort was seen as counter-productive. Ginetti returned to Rome where in 1639, he and Cardinal Bernardino Spada gave assistance and protection to a visiting Carlo Cesare Malvasia.

Unimpressed by Ginetti's efforts in Austria, Pope Urban VIII sent him to Ferrara as legate in 1640 where he amassed considerable wealth and remained until 1643.

Papal conclaves

In 1644 he was appointed Cardinal-Priest at Sant'Eustachio and participated in the papal conclave of that year which elected Pope Innocent X. Contemporary, John Bargrave, suggested Ginetti considered himself papable; suitable for election to the papacy. But the Barberini would not entertain it and any efforts on Ginetti's part to suggest as much came to naught.

He later participated in the conclave of 1655. He was appointed Vice-Dean of the College of Cardinals and held the position during the conclaves of 1667 and 1669–1670.

He died 1671 and was buried at the Sant'Andrea della Valle. He was the uncle of (also later cardinal) Giovanni Francesco Ginetti.

References

1585 births
1671 deaths
People from Velletri
17th-century Italian cardinals
Cardinals created by Pope Urban VIII